The 1979 European Athletics Junior Championships was the fifth edition of the biennial athletics competition for European athletes aged under twenty. It was held in Bydgoszcz, Poland between 16 and 19 August.

Men's results

Women's results

Medal table

References

Results
European Junior Championships 1979. World Junior Athletics History. Retrieved on 2013-05-27.

European Athletics U20 Championships
1979 in Polish sport
European Junior
Sport in Bydgoszcz
1979 in European sport
International athletics competitions hosted by Poland
1979 in youth sport
History of Bydgoszcz